Paralcaligenes ureilyticus is a Gram-negative, non-spore-forming, strictly aerobic and motile bacterium from the genus Paralcaligenes which has been isolated from soil from a ginseng field in Korea.

References 

 

Burkholderiales
Bacteria described in 2011